Asimoneura is a genus of tephritid  or fruit flies in the family Tephritidae.

Species
Asimoneura indecora (Loew, 1861)
Asimoneura pantomelas (Bezzi, 1926)
Asimoneura petiolata (Munro, 1931)
Asimoneura shirakii (Munro, 1935)
Asimoneura stroblii Czerny, 1909

References

Tephritinae
Tephritidae genera
Diptera of Asia
Diptera of Africa
Diptera of Europe
Taxa named by Leander Czerny